Kokyu may refer to:
 Kokyū, a traditional Japanese string instrument
 Kōkyū, the section of the Japanese Imperial Palace called the "Dairi" (内裏) where Imperial Family and court ladies lived
 Kokyū (album), the debut album of Lily Chou-Chou